'Cast All Your Cares' was the last single released off Beverley Knight's debut album, The B-Funk. The song was not released as a single in the UK and only received a very limited release in Europe, becoming something of a rarity. The single, like most of The B-Funk era singles did not have a promotional video. "Cast All Your Cares" is dedicated to her mother, Dolores Smith, as stated in the album sleeve notes.

This song was a notable landmark in Knight's career as it was her final single with independent label Dome Records, which Knight signed to in 1994. Knight left the label due to musical differences and signed to Parlophone/EMI which allowed her career to hit new heights.

Track list
CD

"Cast All Your Cares" (Radio Edit #1) 3:46
"Cast All Your Cares" (Radio Edit #2) 3:59
"Cast All Your Cares" (Album Version) 5:13
"In Time" 5:01

Personnel
Written by Beverley Knight, Neville Thomas and Pule Pheto
Produced by Neville Thomas and Pule Pheto
All vocals performed by Beverley Knight

References

See also
Beverley Knight discography

Beverley Knight songs
Songs written by Beverley Knight
1996 songs
Songs written by Pule Pheto
Songs written by Neville Thomas